The Bernese Alps are a mountain range of the Alps, located in western Switzerland. Although the name suggests that they are located in the Berner Oberland region of the canton of Bern, portions of the Bernese Alps are in the adjacent cantons of Valais, Fribourg and Vaud, the latter being usually named Fribourg Alps and Vaud Alps respectively. The highest mountain in the range, the Finsteraarhorn, is also the highest point in the canton of Bern.

The Rhône valley separates them from the Chablais Alps in the west and from the Pennine Alps in the south; the upper Rhône valley separates them from the Lepontine Alps to the southeast; the Grimsel Pass and the Aare valley separates them from the Uri Alps in the east, and from the Emmental Alps in the north; their northwestern edge is not well defined, describing a line roughly from Lake Geneva to Lake Thun. The Bernese Alps are drained by the river Aare and its tributary the Saane in the north, the Rhône in the south, and the Reuss in the east.

The Bernese Alps are amongst the three highest major subranges of the Alps, together with the Pennine Alps and the Mont Blanc massif.

Geography
One of the most prominent Alpine ranges, the Bernese Alps extend from the gorge of Saint-Maurice, through which the Rhône finds its way to Lake Geneva, to the Grimsel Pass or, depending on the definition, to the river Reuss (thus including the Uri Alps). The principal ridge, a chain that runs  from west (Dent de Morcles) to east (Sidelhorn), whose highest peak is the Finsteraarhorn, forms the watershed between the cantons of Bern and Valais. Except for the westernmost part, it is also the watershed between the Rhine (North Sea) and the Rhône (Mediterranean Sea). This chain is not centered inside the range but lies close (10 to 15 km) to the Rhône on the south. This makes a large difference between the south, where the lateral short valleys descend abruptly into the deep trench forming the valley of the Rhône and the north, where the Bernese Alps extends through a great part of the canton of Bern (Bernese Oberland), throwing out branches to the west into the adjoining cantons of Vaud and Fribourg. There the mountains progressively become lower and disappear into the hilly Swiss Plateau. The Bernese Alps have a large influence on the climate of Switzerland: while their north side is very exposed to weather, their south side is protected from it. As a consequence, agriculture consists essentially of dairy farming and cattle breeding on the northern foothills, while on the sunnier southern foothills (Rhone Valley) it also consists of vineyards.

Gemmi Pass is the most central of the major passes through the main chain. The latter section, contrary to the former, has very few foothills and is the most glaciated part of the Alps.

A characteristic in the orography of the Bernese Alps is, that whereas the western portion of that chain consists of a single series of summits with comparatively short projecting buttresses, the higher group presents a series of longitudinal ridges parallel to the axis of the main chain, and separated from each other by deep valleys that form the channels of great glaciers. Thus the Tschingel Glacier and the Kander Glacier, separate the portion of the main range lying between the Gemmi Pass and the Mittaghorn from the equally high parallel range of the Doldenhorn and Blümlisalp on its northern side. To the south the same portion of the main range is divided from the still higher parallel range whose summits are the Aletschhorn and the Bietschhorn by the Lötschental and the Lötschenlücke. To this again succeeds the deep trench through which the lower part of the Aletsch Glacier flows down to the Rhône, enclosed by the minor ridge that culminates at the Eggishorn.

It is in the central and eastern portions of the range only that crystalline rocks make their appearance; the western part is composed almost exclusively of sedimentary deposits, and the secondary ridges extending through Bern and the adjoining cantons are formed of jurassic, cretaceous, or eocene strata.

Exploration

The beauty of the scenery and the facilities offered to travellers by the general extension of mountain railways make the northern side of the range, the Bernese Oberland, one of the portions of the Alps most visited by tourists. Since strangers first began to visit the Alps, the names of Grindelwald, Lauterbrunnen, and Interlaken have become famous. But unlike many other Alpine regions, which have been left to be explored by strangers, this region has been long visited by Swiss travellers and men of science. Among them were the brother Meyer of Aarau and Franz Joseph Hugi. They have explored most of the mountain ranges not very difficult of access, and have climbed most of the higher summits. In 1841, Louis Agassiz, with several scientific friends, established a temporary station on the Unteraar Glacier, and, along with scientific observations on the glaciers, started a series of expeditions. Several mountains in the area are named after Agassiz and the other explorers. The works of Desor and Gottlieb Studer have been followed by several other publications that bear testimony to Swiss mountaineering activity. Notwithstanding the activity of their predecessors, the members of the English Alpine Club have found scope for further exploits, amongst which may be reckoned the first ascents of the Aletschhorn and the Schreckhorn, and the still more arduous enterprise of crossing the range by passes, such as the Jungfraujoch and Eigerjoch, which are considered among the most difficult in the Alps.

Jungfrau-Aletsch area 

The Jungfrau-Aletsch area is located in the eastern Bernese Alps in the most glaciated region of the Alps. It was inscribed as a UNESCO World Heritage Site (Swiss Alps Jungfrau-Aletsch) in 2001 and further expanded in 2007. Its name comes from the Aletsch Glacier and the two summits of the Jungfrau and Bietschhorn, which constitute some of the most impressive features of the site. The actual site (after the extension) includes other large glacier valleys such as the Fiescher Glacier and the Aar Glaciers.

List of peaks 

The chief peaks of the Bernese Alps are:

Glaciers

Main glaciers:

Aletsch Glacier
Fiescher Glacier
Unteraar Glacier
Lower Grindelwald Glacier
Oberaletsch Glacier
Mittelaletsch Glacier
Gauli Glacier
Lang Glacier
Upper Grindelwald Glacier
Kander Glacier
Tschingel Glacier
Rosenlaui Glacier
Plaine Morte Glacier
Wildstrubel Glacier
Tsanfleuron Glacier
Diablerets Glacier

List of mountains lakes 

Grimselsee
Oberaarsee
Lac de Tseuzier
Daubensee
Lac de Sénin
Oschinensee

List of passes 

The chief passes of the Bernese Alps are:

See also

Bernese Alps in the wide sense
Swiss Alps
The Alps (documentary film)

References

External links 

Bernese Alps at NASA Earth Observatory

 
Bern–Fribourg border
Bern–Valais border
Bern–Vaud border
Fribourg–Vaud border
Alps
Landforms of the canton of Fribourg
Landforms of Valais
Landforms of the canton of Vaud
Mountain ranges of Switzerland
Mountain ranges of the Alps
Valais–Vaud border
World Heritage Sites in Switzerland